East Badger Creek Culvert, at 182nd Rd. approx. .3 mi. E. of 131st Rd. in Winfield, Kansas, is a small stone arch bridge built in 1905–06. It has a single arch.

It was listed on the National Register of Historic Places in 2015.

It was deemed notable as "a small, representative example of several stone arch bridges and culverts built in Kansas in the early 1900s. The culvert retains its character-defining features of limestone arch rings and spandrels that spring from stone abutments."

References

Bridges on the National Register of Historic Places in Kansas
Buildings and structures completed in 1915
Cowley County, Kansas
Bridges in Kansas